Sean O'Sullivan is an entrepreneur, inventor and investor, born in New York City and currently living in Princeton, New Jersey. He is best known for co-founding MapInfo Corporation, which popularized street maps on computers, and for coining the term "Cloud Computing". He is the founder and managing partner of SOSV.

As benefactor of the O’Sullivan Foundation, he has also been a primary funder of organizations such as the Khan Academy and CoderDojo.In 1995, O' Sullivan founded SOSV (formerly SOSventures), a venture capital and investment management firm that seeks to invest in the earliest stages of start-up companies via a family of accelerator programs.

O'Sullivan holds a Bachelor of Science in Electrical Engineering from Rensselaer Polytechnic Institute and a Master of Fine Arts in Film Production from the University of Southern California. Sean Sullivan spent two seasons as an investor on Dragon's Den.

References

External links
Carma

21st-century American engineers
American filmmakers
American investors
American humanitarians
Living people
Year of birth missing (living people)